A chultun (plural: chultunob' or chultuns) is a bottle-shaped underground storage chamber built by the pre-Columbian Maya in southern Mesoamerica. Their entrances were surrounded by plastered aprons which guided rainwater into them during the rainy seasons.  Most of these archaeological features likely functioned as cisterns for potable water.

Chultunob' were typically constructed in locations where naturally occurring cenotes were absent (such as the Puuc hills, which sit hundreds of feet above the Yucatán Peninsula aquifer).  While many were constructed to collect water, not all may have served that purpose.  Some chultuns may have been used for storage of perishable comestibles or for the fermentation of alcoholic beverages.  Experimental research conducted in the 1960s by Mayanist Dennis E. Puleston demonstrated that chultuns around Tikal were particularly effective for long-term storage of ramon nuts (Brosimum alicastrum).

After a chultun ended its usefulness, many were used for discarding refuse or for human burials.  This makes chultunob' an excellent source of information on both the life and death of ancient settlements of the Prehispanic Maya.

See also

Americas (terminology)
Indigenous peoples of Mexico
Indigenous peoples of the Americas
Mesoamerican region

Notes

External links 
 
 Mesoamerican Photo Archives: click on "chultun" for more info

Maya civilization
Mesoamerican architecture
Water supply infrastructure